Conflict resolution is conceptualized as the methods and processes involved in facilitating the peaceful ending of conflict and retribution. Committed group members attempt to resolve group conflicts by actively communicating information about their conflicting motives or ideologies to the rest of group (e.g., intentions; reasons for holding certain beliefs) and by engaging in collective negotiation. Dimensions of resolution typically parallel the dimensions of conflict in the way the conflict is processed. Cognitive resolution is the way disputants understand and view the conflict, with beliefs, perspectives, understandings and attitudes. Emotional resolution is in the way disputants feel about a conflict, the emotional energy. Behavioral resolution is reflective of how the disputants act, their behavior. Ultimately a wide range of methods and procedures for addressing conflict exist, including negotiation, mediation, mediation-arbitration, diplomacy, and creative peacebuilding.

The term conflict resolution may also be used interchangeably with dispute resolution, where arbitration and litigation processes are critically involved. The concept of conflict resolution can be thought to encompass the use of nonviolent resistance measures by conflicted parties in an attempt to promote effective resolution.

Theories and models 
There are a plethora of different theories and models linked to the concept of conflict resolution. A few of them are described below.

Conflict resolution curve 
There are many examples of conflict resolution in history, and there has been a debate about the ways to conflict resolution: whether it should be forced or peaceful. Conflict resolution by peaceful means is generally perceived to be a better option. The conflict resolution curve derived from an analytical model that offers a peaceful solution by motivating conflicting entities. Forced resolution of conflict might invoke another conflict in the future.

Conflict resolution curve (CRC) separates conflict styles into two separate domains: domain of competing entities and domain of accommodating entities. There is a sort of agreement between targets and aggressors on this curve. Their judgements of badness compared to goodness of each other are analogous on CRC. So, arrival of conflicting entities to some negotiable points on CRC is important before peace building. CRC does not exist (i.e., singular) in reality if the aggression of the aggressor is certain. Under such circumstances it might lead to apocalypse with mutual destruction.
 
The curve explains why nonviolent struggles ultimately toppled repressive regimes and sometimes forced leaders to change the nature of governance. Also, this methodology has been applied to capture conflict styles on the Korean Peninsula and dynamics of negotiation processes.

Dual concern model
The dual concern model of conflict resolution is a conceptual perspective that assumes individuals' preferred method of dealing with conflict is based on two underlying themes or dimensions: concern for self (assertiveness) and concern for others (empathy).

According to the model, group members balance their concern for satisfying personal needs and interests with their concern for satisfying the needs and interests of others in different ways. The intersection of these two dimensions ultimately leads individuals towards exhibiting different styles of conflict resolution. The dual model identifies five conflict resolution styles or strategies that individuals may use depending on their dispositions toward pro-self or pro-social goals.
 
Avoidance conflict style
 Characterized by joking, changing or avoiding the topic, or even denying that a problem exists, the conflict avoidance style is used when an individual has withdrawn in dealing with the other party, when one is uncomfortable with conflict, or due to cultural contexts. During conflict, these avoiders adopt a "wait and see" attitude, often allowing conflict to phase out on its own without any personal involvement. By neglecting to address high-conflict situations, avoiders risk allowing problems to fester or spin out of control.

Accommodating conflict style
 In contrast, yielding, "accommodating", smoothing or suppression conflict styles are characterized by a high level of concern for others and a low level of concern for oneself. This passive pro-social approach emerges when individuals derive personal satisfaction from meeting the needs of others and have a general concern for maintaining stable, positive social relationships. When faced with conflict, individuals with an accommodating conflict style tend to harmonize into others' demands out of respect for the social relationship. With this sense of yielding to the conflict, individuals fall back to others' input instead of finding solutions with their own intellectual resolution.

Competitive conflict style
 The competitive, "fighting" or forcing conflict style maximizes individual assertiveness (i.e., concern for self) and minimizes empathy (i.e., concern for others). Groups consisting of competitive members generally enjoy seeking domination over others, and typically see conflict as a "win or lose" predicament. Fighters tend to force others to accept their personal views by employing competitive power tactics (arguments, insults, accusations or even violence) that foster intimidation.

Conciliation conflict style
 The conciliation, "compromising", bargaining or negotiation conflict style is typical of individuals who possess an intermediate level of concern for both personal and others' outcomes. Compromisers value fairness and, in doing so, anticipate mutual give-and-take interactions. By accepting some demands put forth by others, compromisers believe this agreeableness will encourage others to meet them halfway, thus promoting conflict resolution. This conflict style can be considered an extension of both "yielding" and "cooperative" strategies.

Cooperation conflict style
 Characterized by an active concern for both pro-social and pro-self behavior, the cooperation, integration, confrontation or problem-solving conflict style is typically used when an individual has elevated interests in their own outcomes as well as in the outcomes of others. During conflict, cooperators collaborate with others in an effort to find an amicable solution that satisfies all parties involved in the conflict. Individuals using this type of conflict style tend to be both highly assertive and highly empathetic. By seeing conflict as a creative opportunity, collaborators willingly invest time and resources into finding a "win-win" solution. According to the literature on conflict resolution, a cooperative conflict resolution style is recommended above all others. This resolution may be achieved by lowering the aggressor's guard while raising the ego.

Relational dialectics theory 
Relational dialectics theory (RDT), introduced by Leslie Baxter and Barbara Matgomery (1988), explores the ways in which people in relationships use verbal communication to manage conflict and contradiction as opposed to psychology. This concept focuses on maintaining a relationship even through contradictions that arise and how relationships are managed through coordinated talk. RDT assumes that relationships are composed of opposing tendencies, are constantly changing, and tensions arises from intimate relationships.

The main concepts of RDT are:

 Contradictions – The concept is that the contrary has the characteristics of its opposite. People can seek to be in a relationship but still need their space.
 Totality – The totality comes when the opposites unite. Thus, the relationship is balanced with contradictions and only then it reaches totality
 Process – Comprehended through various social processes. These processes simultaneously continue within a relationship in a recurring manner.
 Praxis – The relationship progresses with experience and both people interact and communicate effectively to meet their needs. Praxis is a concept of practicability in making decisions in a relationship despite opposing wants and needs

Strategy of conflict 
Strategy of conflict, by Thomas Schelling, is the study of negotiation during conflict and strategic behavior that results in the development of "conflict behavior". This idea is based largely on game theory. In "A Reorientation of Game Theory", Schelling discusses ways in which one can redirect the focus of a conflict in order to gain advantage over an opponent.

 Conflict is a contest. Rational behavior, in this contest, is a matter of judgment and perception.
 Strategy makes predictions using "rational behavior – behavior motivated by a serious calculation of advantages, a calculation that in turn is based on an explicit and internally consistent value system".
 Cooperation is always temporary, interests will change.

Conflict resolution in peace and conflict studies

Definition 
Within peace and conflict studies a definition of conflict resolution is presented in Peter Wallensteen's book Understanding Conflict Resolution:

The "conflicting parties" concerned in this definition are formally or informally organized groups engaged in intrastate or interstate conflict.
'Basic incompatibility' refers to a severe disagreement between at least two sides where their demands cannot be met by the same resources at the same time.

Mechanisms 
One theory discussed within the field of peace and conflict studies is conflict resolution mechanisms: independent procedures in which the conflicting parties can have confidence. They can be formal or informal arrangements with the intention of resolving the conflict. In Understanding Conflict Resolution Wallensteen draws from the works of Lewis A. Coser, Johan Galtung and Thomas Schelling, and presents seven distinct theoretical mechanisms for conflict resolutions:

 A shift in priorities for one of the conflicting parties. While it is rare that a party completely changes its basic positions, it can display a shift in to what it gives highest priority. In such an instance new possibilities for conflict resolutions may arise.
 The contested resource is divided. In essence, this means both conflicting parties display some extent of shift in priorities which then opens up for some form of "meeting the other side halfway" agreement.
 Horse-trading between the conflicting parties. This means that one side gets all of its demands met on one issue, while the other side gets all of its demands met on another issue.
 The parties decide to share control, and rule together over the contested resource. It could be permanent, or a temporary arrangement for a transition period that, when over, has led to a transcendence of the conflict. 
 The parties agree to leave control to someone else. In this mechanism the primary parties agree, or accept, that a third party takes control over the contested resource. 
 The parties resort to conflict resolution mechanisms, notably arbitration or other legal procedures. This means finding a procedure for resolving the conflict through some of the previously mentioned five ways, but with the added quality that it is done through a process outside of the parties' immediate control.
 Some issues can be left for later. The argument for this is that political conditions and popular attitudes can change, and some issues can gain from being delayed, as their significance may pale with time.

Intrastate and interstate 

According to conflict database Uppsala Conflict Data Program's definition war may occur between parties who contest an incompatibility. The nature of an incompatibility can be territorial or governmental, but a warring party must be a "government of a state or any opposition organization or alliance of organizations that uses armed force to promote its position in the incompatibility in an intrastate or an interstate armed conflict". Wars can conclude with a peace agreement, which is a "formal agreement... which addresses the disputed incompatibility, either by settling all or part of it, or by clearly outlining a process for how [...] to regulate the incompatibility." A ceasefire is another form of agreement made by warring parties; unlike a peace agreement, it only "regulates the conflict behaviour of warring parties", and does not resolve the issue that brought the parties to war in the first place.

Peacekeeping measures may be deployed to avoid violence in solving such incompatibilities. Beginning in the last century, political theorists have been developing the theory of a global peace system that relies upon broad social and political measures to avoid war in the interest of achieving world peace. The Blue Peace approach developed by Strategic Foresight Group facilitates cooperation between countries over shared water resources, thus reducing the risk of war and enabling sustainable development.

Conflict resolution is an expanding field of professional practice, both in the U.S. and around the world. The escalating costs of conflict have increased use of third parties who may serve as a conflict specialists to resolve conflicts. In fact, relief and development organizations have added peace-building specialists to their teams. Many major international non-governmental organizations have seen a growing need to hire practitioners trained in conflict analysis and resolution. Furthermore, this expansion has resulted in the need for conflict resolution practitioners to work in a variety of settings such as in businesses, court systems, government agencies, nonprofit organizations, and educational institutions throughout the world.

In the workplace 

According to the Cambridge dictionary, a basic definition of conflict is: "an active disagreement between people with opposing opinions or principles." Conflicts such as disagreements may occur at any moment, being a normal part of human interactions. The type of conflict and its severity may vary both in content and degree of seriousness; however, it is impossible to completely avoid it. Actually, conflict in itself is not necessarily a negative thing. When handled constructively it can help people to stand up for themselves and others, to evolve and learn how to work together to achieve a mutually satisfactory solution. But if conflict is handled poorly it can cause anger, hurt, divisiveness and more serious problems.

If it is impossible to completely avoid conflict as it was said, the possibilities to experience it are usually higher particularly in complex social contexts in which important diversities are at stake. Specially because of this reason, speaking about conflict resolution becomes fundamental in ethnically diverse and multicultural work environments, in which not only "regular" work disagreements may occur but in which also different languages, worldviews, lifestyles and ultimately value differences may diverge.

Conflict resolution is the process by which two or more parties engaged in a disagreement, dispute or debate reach an agreement resolving it. It involves a series of stages, involved actors, models and approaches that may depend on the kind of confrontation at stake and the surrounded social and cultural context. However, there are some general actions and personal skills that may be very useful when facing a conflict to solve (independently of its nature), e.g. an open minded orientation able to analyze the different point of views and perspectives involved, as well as an ability to empathize, carefully listen and clearly communicate with all the parts involved. Sources of conflict may be so many, depending on the particular situation and the specific context, but some of the most common include:
 
Personal differences such as values, ethics, personalities, age, education, gender, socioeconomic status, cultural background, temperament, health, religion, political beliefs, etc. Thus, almost any social category that serves to differentiate people may become an object of conflict when it does negatively diverge with people who do not share it. Clashes of ideas, choices or actions. Conflict occurs when people does not share common goals, or common ways to reach a particular objective (e.g. different work styles). Conflict occurs also when there is direct or indirect competition between people or when someone may feel excluded from a particular activity or by some people within the company. Lack of communication or poor communication are also significant reasons to start a conflict, to misunderstand a particular situation and to create potentially explosive interactions.

Fundamental strategies 

Although different conflicts may require different ways to handle them, this is a list of fundamental strategies that may be implemented when handling a conflictive situation:

 Reaching agreement on rules and procedures: Establishing ground rules may include the following actions: a. Determining a site for the meeting; b. Setting a formal agenda; c. Determining who attends; d. Setting time limits; e. Setting procedural rules; f. Following specific "do(s) and don't(s)".
 Reducing tension and synchronizing the de-escalation of hostility: In highly emotional situations when people feel angry, upset, frustrated, it is important to implement the following actions: a. Separating the involved parties; b. Managing tensions – jokes as an instrument to give the opportunity for catharsis; c. Acknowledging others' feelings – actively listening to others; d. De-escalation by public statements by parties – about the concession, the commitments of the parties.
 Improving the accuracy of communication, particularly improving each party's understanding of the other's perception: a. Accurate understanding of the other's position; b. Role reversal, trying to adopt the other's position (empathetic attitudes); c. Imaging – describing how they see themselves, how the other parties appears to them, how they think the other parties will describe them and how the others see themselves.
 Controlling the number and size of issues in the discussion: a. Fractionate the negotiation – a method that divides a large conflict into smaller parts: 1. Reduce the number of parties on each side; 2. Control the number of substantive issues; 3. Search for different ways to divide big issues.
 Establishing common ground where parties can find a basis for agreement: a. Establishing common goals or superordinate goals; b. Establishing common enemies; c. Identifying common expectations; d. Managing time constraints and deadlines; e. Reframing the parties' view of each other; f. Build trust through the negotiation process.
 Enhancing the desirability of the options and alternatives that each party presents to the other: a. Giving the other party an acceptable proposal; b. Asking for a different decision; c. Sweeten the other rather than intensifying the threat; d. Elaborating objective or legitimate criteria to evaluate all possible solutions.

Approaches 

A conflict is a common phenomenon in the workplace; as mentioned before, it can occur because of the most different grounds of diversity and under very different circumstances. However, it is usually a matter of interests, needs, priorities, goals or values interfering with each other; and, often, a result of different perceptions more than actual differences. Conflicts may involve team members, departments, projects, organization and client, boss and subordinate, organization needs vs. personal needs, and they are usually immersed in complex relations of power that need to be understood and interpreted in order to define the more tailored way to manage the conflict. There are, nevertheless, some main approaches that may be applied when trying to solve a conflict that may lead to very different outcomes to be valued according to the particular situation and the available negotiation resources:

Forcing 
When one of the conflict's parts firmly pursues his or her own concerns despite the resistance of the other(s). This may involve pushing one viewpoint at the expense of another or maintaining firm resistance to the counterpart's actions; it is also commonly known as "competing".
Forcing may be appropriate when all other, less forceful methods, do not work or are ineffective; when someone needs to stand up for his/her own rights (or the represented group/organization's rights), resist aggression and pressure. It may be also considered a suitable option when a quick resolution is required and using force is justified (e.g. in a life-threatening situation, to stop an aggression), and as a very last resort to resolve a long-lasting conflict.

However, forcing may also negatively affect the relationship with the opponent in the long run; may intensified the conflict if the opponent decides to react in the same way (even if it was not the original intention); it does not allow to take advantage in a productive way of the other side's position and, last but not least, taking this approach may require a lot of energy and be exhausting to some individuals.

Win-win / collaborating 
Collaboration involves an attempt to work with the other part involved in the conflict to find a win-win solution to the problem in hand, or at least to find a solution that most satisfies the concerns of both parties. The win-win approach sees conflict resolution as an opportunity to come to a mutually beneficial result; and it includes identifying the underlying concerns of the opponents and finding an alternative which meets each party's concerns. From that point of view, it is the most desirable outcome when trying to solve a problem for all partners.

Collaborating may be the best solution when consensus and commitment of other parties is important; when the conflict occurs in a collaborative, trustworthy environment and when it is required to address the interests of multiple stakeholders. But more specially, it is the most desirable outcome when a long-term relationship is important so that people can continue to collaborate in a productive way; collaborating is in few words, sharing responsibilities and mutual commitment. For parties involved, the outcome of the conflict resolution is less stressful; however, the process of finding and establishing a win-win solution may be longer and should be very involving.

It may require more effort and more time than some other methods; for the same reason, collaborating may not be practical when timing is crucial and a quick solution or fast response is required.

Compromising 
Different from the win-win solution, in this outcome the conflict parties find a mutually acceptable solution which partially satisfies both parties. This can occur as both parties converse with one another and seek to understand the other's point of view. Compromising may be an optimal solution when the goals are moderately important and not worth the use of more assertive or more involving approaches. It may be useful when reaching temporary settlement on complex issues and as a first step when the involved parties do not know each other well or have not yet developed a high level of mutual trust. Compromising may be a faster way to solve things when time is a factor. The level of tensions can be lower as well, but the result of the conflict may be also less satisfactory.

If this method is not well managed, and the factor time becomes the most important one, the situation may result in both parties being not satisfied with the outcome (i.e. a lose-lose situation). Moreover, it does not contribute to building trust in the long run and it may require a closer monitoring of the kind of partially satisfactory compromises acquired.

Withdrawing 
This technique consists on not addressing the conflict, postpone it or simply withdrawing; for that reason, it is also known as Avoiding. This outcome is suitable when the issue is trivial and not worth the effort or when more important issues are pressing, and one or both the parties do not have time to deal with it. Withdrawing may be also a strategic response when it is not the right time or place to confront the issue, when more time is needed to think and collect information before acting or when not responding may bring still some winnings for at least some of the involves parties. Moreover, withdrawing may be also employed when someone know that the other party is totally engaged with hostility and does not want (can not) to invest further unreasonable efforts.

Withdrawing may give the possibility to see things from a different perspective while gaining time and collecting further information, and specially is a low stress approach particularly when the conflict is a short time one. However, not acting may be interpreted as an agreement and therefore it may lead to weakening or losing a previously gained position with one or more parties involved. Furthermore, when using withdrawing as a strategy more time, skills and experiences together with other actions may need to be implemented.

Smoothing 
Smoothing is accommodating the concerns of others first of all, rather than one's own concerns. This kind of strategy may be applied when the issue of the conflict is much more important for the counterparts whereas for the other is not particularly relevant. It may be also applied when someone accepts that he/she is wrong and furthermore there are no other possible options than continuing an unworthy competing-pushing situation. Just as withdrawing, smoothing may be an option to find at least a temporal solution or obtain more time and information, however, it is not an option when priority interests are at stake.
 
There is a high risk of being abused when choosing the smoothing option. Therefore, it is important to keep the right balance and to not give up one own interests and necessities. Otherwise, confidence in one's ability, mainly with an aggressive opponent, may be seriously damaged, together with credibility by the other parties involved. Needed to say, in these cases a transition to a Win-Win solution in the future becomes particularly more difficult when someone.

Between organizations 
Relationships between organizations, such as strategic alliances, buyer-supplier partnerships, organizational networks, or joint ventures are prone to conflict. Conflict resolution in inter-organizational relationships has attracted the attention of business and management scholars. They have related the forms of conflict (e.g., integrity-based vs. competence-based conflict) to the mode of conflict resolution and the negotiation and repair approaches used by organizations. They have also observed the role of important moderating factors such as the type of contractual arrangement, the level of trust between organizations, or the type of power asymmetry.

Other forms

Conflict management 
Conflict management refers to the long-term management of intractable conflicts. It is the label for the variety of ways by which people handle grievances—standing up for what they consider to be right and against what they consider to be wrong. Those ways include such diverse phenomena as gossip, ridicule, lynching, terrorism, warfare, feuding, genocide, law, mediation, and avoidance. Which forms of conflict management will be used in any given situation can be somewhat predicted and explained by the social structure—or social geometry—of the case.

Conflict management is often considered to be distinct from conflict resolution. 
In order for actual conflict to occur, there should be an expression of exclusive patterns which explain why and how the conflict was expressed the way it was. Conflict is often connected to a previous issue. Resolution refers to resolving a dispute to the approval of one or both parties, whereas management is concerned with an ongoing process that may never have a resolution. Neither is considered the same as conflict transformation, which seeks to reframe the positions of the conflict parties.

Counseling
When personal conflict leads to frustration and loss of efficiency, counseling may prove helpful. Although few organizations can afford to have professional counselors on staff, given some training, managers may be able to perform this function. Nondirective counseling, or "listening with understanding", is little more than being a good listener—something often considered to be important in a manager.

Sometimes simply being able to express one's feelings to a concerned and understanding listener is enough to relieve frustration and make it possible for an individual to advance to a problem-solving frame of mind. The nondirective approach is one effective way for managers to deal with frustrated subordinates and coworkers.

There are other, more direct and more diagnostic, methods that could be used in appropriate circumstances. However, the great strength of the nondirective approach lies in its simplicity, its effectiveness, and that it deliberately avoids the manager-counselor's diagnosing and interpreting emotional problems, which would call for special psychological training. Listening to staff with sympathy and understanding is unlikely to escalate the problem, and is a widely used approach for helping people cope with problems that interfere with their effectiveness in the workplace.

Culture-based

Conflict resolution as both a professional practice and academic field is highly sensitive to cultural practices. In Western cultural contexts, such as Canada and the United States, successful conflict resolution usually involves fostering communication among disputants, problem solving, and drafting agreements that meet underlying needs. In these situations, conflict resolvers often talk about finding a mutually satisfying ("win-win") solution for everyone involved.

In many non-Western cultural contexts, such as Afghanistan, Vietnam, and China, it is also important to find "win-win" solutions; however, the routes taken to find them may be very different. In these contexts, direct communication between disputants that explicitly addresses the issues at stake in the conflict can be perceived as very rude, making the conflict worse and delaying resolution. It can make sense to involve religious, tribal, or community leaders; communicate difficult truths through a third party; or make suggestions through stories. Intercultural conflicts are often the most difficult to resolve because the expectations of the disputants can be very different, and there is much occasion for misunderstanding.

In a 2017 blog post on "the ocean model of civilization" for the British Academy, Nayef Al-Rodhan argued that greater transcultural understanding is critical for global security because it diminishes 'hierarchies' and alienation, and avoids dehumanization of the 'other'.

In animals
Conflict resolution has also been studied in non-humans, including dogs, cats, monkeys, snakes, elephants, and primates. Aggression is more common among relatives and within a group than between groups. Instead of creating distance between the individuals, primates tend to be more intimate in the period after an aggressive incident. These intimacies consist of grooming and various forms of body contact. Stress responses, including increased heart rates, usually decrease after these reconciliatory signals. Different types of primates, as well as many other species who live in groups, display different types of conciliatory behavior. Resolving conflicts that threaten the interaction between individuals in a group is necessary for survival, giving it a strong evolutionary value. These findings contradict previous existing theories about the general function of aggression, i.e. creating space between individuals (first proposed by Konrad Lorenz), which seems to be more the case in conflicts between groups than it is within groups.

In addition to research in primates, biologists are beginning to explore reconciliation in other animals. Until recently, the literature dealing with reconciliation in non-primates has consisted of anecdotal observations and very little quantitative data. Although peaceful post-conflict behavior had been documented going back to the 1960s, it was not until 1993 that Rowell made the first explicit mention of reconciliation in feral sheep. Reconciliation has since been documented in spotted hyenas, lions, bottlenose dolphins, dwarf mongoose, domestic goats, domestic dogs, and, recently, in red-necked wallabies.

Education

Universities worldwide offer programs of study pertaining to conflict research, analysis, and practice. Conrad Grebel University College at the University of Waterloo has the oldest-running peace and conflict studies (PACS) program in Canada. PACS can be taken as an Honors, 4-year general, or 3-year general major, joint major, minor, and diploma. Grebel also offers an interdisciplinary Master of Peace and Conflict Studies professional program. The Cornell University ILR School houses the Scheinman Institute on Conflict Resolution, which offers undergraduate, graduate, and professional training on conflict resolution. It also offers dispute resolution concentrations for its , JD/MILR, MPS, and MS/PhD graduate degree programs. At the graduate level, Eastern Mennonite University's Center for Justice and Peacebuilding offers a Master of Arts in Conflict Transformation, a dual Master of Divinity/MA in Conflict Transformation degree, and several graduate certificates. EMU also offers an accelerated 5-year BA in Peacebuilding and Development/MA in Conflict Transformation. Additional graduate programs are offered at Georgetown University, Johns Hopkins University, Creighton University, the University of North Carolina at Greensboro, and Trinity College Dublin. George Mason University's Jimmy and Rosalynn Carter School for Peace and Conflict Resolution offers BA, BS, MS, and PhD degrees in Conflict Analysis and Resolution, as well as an undergraduate minor, graduate certificates, and joint degree programs. Nova Southeastern University also offers a PhD in Conflict Analysis & Resolution, in both online and on-campus formats.

Conflict resolution is a growing area of interest in UK pedagogy, with teachers and students both encouraged to learn about mechanisms that lead to aggressive action and those that lead to peaceful resolution. The University of Law, one of the oldest common law training institutions in the world, offers a legal-focused master's degree in conflict resolution as an LL.M. (Conflict resolution).

Tel Aviv University offers two graduate degree programs in the field of conflict resolution, including the English-language International Program in Conflict Resolution and Mediation, allowing students to learn in a geographic region which is the subject of much research on international conflict resolution.

The Nelson Mandela Center for Peace & Conflict Resolution at Jamia Millia Islamia University, New Delhi, is one of the first centers for peace and conflict resolution to be established at an Indian university. It offers a two-year full-time MA course in Conflict Analysis and Peace-Building, as well as a PhD in Conflict and Peace Studies.

In Sweden Linnaeus University, Lund University and Uppsala University offer programs on bachelor, master and/or doctoral level in Peace and Conflict Studies. Uppsala University also hosts its own Department of Peace and Conflict Research, among other things occupied with running the conflict database UCDP (Uppsala Conflict Data Program).

See also

 Civil resistance
 Conflict continuum
 Conflict early warning
 Conflict management
 Conflict resolution research
 Conflict style inventory
 Cost of conflict
 Dialectic
 Dialogue
 Fair fighting
 Family therapy
 Gunnysacking
 Interpersonal communication
 Let the Wookiee win
 Nonviolent Communication

Organizations
 Center for the Study of Genocide, Conflict Resolution, and Human Rights
 Conscience: Taxes for Peace not War is a London organisation that promotes peacebuilding as an alternative to military security
 Crisis Management Initiative (CMI)
 Heidelberg Institute for International Conflict Research
 Peninsula Conflict Resolution Center
 Jimmy and Rosalynn Carter School for Peace and Conflict Resolution
 Search for Common Ground is one of the world's largest non-government organisations dedicated to conflict resolution
 Seeds of Peace develops and empowers young leaders from regions of conflict to work towards peace through coexistence
 United Network of Young Peacebuilders (UNOY) is a global non-governmental organization and youth network dedicated to the role of youth in peacebuilding and conflict resolution
 University for Peace is a United Nations mandated organization and graduate school dedicated to conflict resolution and peace studies
 Uppsala Conflict Data Program is an academic data collection project that provides descriptions of political violence and conflict resolution

Footnotes

References

Works cited
 Augsburger, D. (1992). Conflict mediation across cultures. Louisville, Kentucky: Westminster / John Knox Press.
 Bannon, I. & Paul Collier (Eds.). (2003). Natural resources and violent conflict: Options and actions. Washington, D.C: The World Bank.
 Ury, F. & Rodger Fisher. (1981). Getting to yes: Negotiating agreement without giving in. New York, NY: Penguin Group.
 Wilmot, W. & Jouyce Hocker. (2007). Interpersonal conflict. New York, NY: McGraw-Hill Companies.
 Bercovitch, Jacob and Jackson, Richard. 2009. Conflict Resolution in the Twenty-first Century: Principles, Methods, and Approaches. University of Michigan Press, Ann Arbor.
 de Waal, Frans B. M. and Angeline van Roosmalen. 1979. Reconciliation and consolation among chimpanzees. Behavioral Ecology and Sociobiology 5: 55–66.
 de Waal, Frans B. M. 1989. Peacemaking Among Primates. Harvard University Press, Cambridge, MA.
 
 
 de Waal, Frans B. M. and Filippo Aureli. 1996. Consolation, reconciliation, and a possible cognitive difference between macaques and chimpanzees. Reaching into thought: The minds of the great apes (Eds. Anne E. Russon, Kim A. Bard, Sue Taylor Parker), Cambridge University Press, New York, NY: 80–110.
 
 
 Aureli, Filippo and Frans B. M. de Waal, eds. 2000. Natural Conflict Resolution. University of California Press, Berkeley, CA.
 de Waal, Frans B. M. 2000. Primates––A natural heritage of conflict resolution. Science 289: 586–590.
 Hicks, Donna. 2011. Dignity: The Essential Role It Plays in Resolving Conflict. Yale University Press
 
 
 
 
 Lorenzen, Michael. 2006. Conflict Resolution and Academic Library Instruction. LOEX Quarterly 33, no. 1/2: 6–9, 11.
 Winslade, John & Monk, Gerald. 2000. Narrative Mediation: A New Approach to Conflict Resolution. Jossey-Bass Publishers, San Francisco.
 Bar-Siman-Tov, Yaacov (Ed.) (2004). From Conflict Resolution to Reconciliation. Oxford University Press
Tesler, Pauline. 2001, 2008. Collaborative Law: Achieving Effective Resolution in Divorce without Litigation (American Bar Association).
Tesler, Pauline and Thompson, Peggy. 2006. Collaborative Divorce: The Revolutionary New Way to Restructure Your Family, Resolve Legal Issues, and Move On with Your Life (Harper Collins).

Further reading

 
 
 

Conflict (process)
Dispute resolution
Family therapy
Interpersonal relationships
Reconciliation